KSJK (1230 AM) is a radio station licensed to Talent, Oregon. The station is owned by Southern Oregon University, and is an affiliate of Jefferson Public Radio.  It is the flagship of JPR's "News & Information" service, consisting of news and talk programming.

KSJK signed on as KRVC in 1961 as a 1,000-watt, daytime-only outlet on 1350 kHz, licensed to Ashland, Oregon. It was owned by Faith Tabernacle, Inc. In 1983 it was authorized to move to 1230 kHz and to change the city of license to Talent.

The station was destroyed in the Almeda Drive Fire on September 8, 2020.

References

External links
ijpr.org

Authorization to change frequency and city of license

SJK
NPR member stations
Talent, Oregon
Southern Oregon University
1960 establishments in Oregon